Morten Søndergaard (3 October 1964 in Copenhagen) is a Danish writer, translator, editor and artist.

Life
From 1989 to 1991, Morten Søndergaard attended the Danish Writer's school (Forfatterskolen) in Copenhagen, and obtained his MA in comparative literature at the University of Copenhagen in 1995. From 2002 to 2008 he co-edited the literary magazine Hvedekorn with Thomas Thøfner, and also co-founded the poetry magazine Øverste Kirurgiske (Upper surgery). In 2003 and again in 2007 he was nominated for the Nordic Council Literature Prize. He has since 1998 been living in Italy, first in the town Vinci, Tuscany, then in Pietrasanta. Søndergaard used his time in Italy as the basis for two of his works, Vinci, Senere and Processen og det halve kongerige.

Work
Søndergaard debuted in 1992 with Sahara i mine hænder (Sahara in my hands). His breakthrough to a wider audience came in 1998 with Bier dør sovende (Bees die sleeping). Based on his experiences living in and coming back to Italy, the poetry collection Vinci, Senere (Vinci, Later; 2002), deals with the subjects of time and movement. These themes are expanded in the collection Et skridt i den rigtige retning, (A step in the right direction, 2005), which explores the relation between walking and poetry. In the poetical narrative Processen og det halve kongerige (The process and half the kingdom, 2010), Søndergaard again returns to his time in Italy, and to his childhood, this time focusing on perception and the senses.

In his poetry, Søndergaard "lets the world intrude and enrich the imagination, so that new, surreal and hyper-real images emerge – with a different outlook on the world as a result. Not quite without humour". His books have been translated into Arabic, English, German, French, Italian, Swedish and Serbian.

While Søndergaard primarily works as a poet, he has also branched out into numerous other media. He has thus created a series of exhibitions and installations, as well as having produced both musical and dramatic works. The sensorial nature of his poetry and the physical nature of some of his other works thus combine to bring poetry and world closer together. In the artist's own words: "I try to approach both poetry and world by making the two phenomena collide and then see what happens.". He has also translated several works by Jorge Luis Borges into Danish.
Søndergaards Ordapotek (Wordpharmacy) is a concrete poetical work, which equates the structure of language with pharmaceutical products. This poetic experiment consists of ten boxes of medicines, one for each word class, such as verbs, nouns or adverb. A leaflet in each package explains the dangers of overdose and the like. For example, the leaflet for Pronouns explains: "Use Pronouns once a day. Drink plenty of water. After the first week you can increase the number of Pronouns used to as much as 2 Pronouns daily, depending on what has been agreed with the others. You can use Pronouns any time of day, by itself or together with a meal. Pronounce Pronouns loudly and clearly. Do not chew them.".

Søndergaard’s explorations of the various collisions between meaning and materiality has resulted in extra-linguistic works that span sound art, artists books, asemic writing strategies and performance. His artistic practice unfolds around explorations and challenges of what poetry can be and is, and how it can subsist in the breaches and connections between signs and things.

Morten Søndergaards poetry collections has been translated into more than ten languages around the world.

Bibliography

In Danish 
 1992: Sahara i mine hænder (poetry)
 1994: Ild og tal (poetry)
 1996: Ubestemmelsessteder (short prose)
 1998: Hypoteser for to stemmer (with Tomas Thøfner)
 1998: Bier dør sovende (poetry)
 2000: Tingenes orden (novel)
 2002: Vinci, senere (poetry)
 2004: Fedtdigte (poetry)
 2004: At holde havet tilbage med en kost (essays)
 2005: Et skridt i den rigtige retning (poetry)
 2009: Må sort dreng dø ren (poetry)
 2010: Processen og det halve kongerige (poetry)
 2012: Ordapotek (book object)
 2013: Fordele og ulemper ved at udvikle vinger (poetry)
 2016: Døden er en del af mit navn (poetry)

Translations in English 
 2005: An Inherited Ocean
 2006: Vinci, later
 2012: A step in the right direction
 2012: Wordpharmacy

Discography
 2000: Kompas (with Tommy Gregersen)
 2001: Turbo remix
 2006: AudioPoesi - Superpositionsprincippet
 2007: Hjertets abe sparker sig fri (with Jakob Schweppenhäuser and Emil Thomsen)
 2015: The sound of my room

Prizes and Grants 
 Drachmannlegatet, 2020
 Received a lifetime grant from Danish Arts Council 2014
 Morten Nielsens Legat, 2008
 Harald Kidde og Peder Jensen Kjærgaards Fond 2008
 Beatrice Prize, 2006 (Pia Tafdrups tale for Morten Søndergaard ved overrækkelsen)
 Peter Freuchens Mindelegat, 2003
 Michael Strunge Prize, 1998
 Received the three-years grant from Danish Arts Council for the period 1997-1999

References

External links 
 Website: Morten Søndergaard
 Website: Wordpharmacy
 Word pharmacy
 Morten Søndergaard reads Eufori and Hundeslagsmål from Vinci, Senere
 Hjertets abe sparker sig fri

Danish male poets
University of Copenhagen alumni
People from Copenhagen
1964 births
Living people
20th-century Danish poets
21st-century Danish poets
20th-century Danish male writers
21st-century Danish male writers